The 2018–19 Alcorn State Braves basketball team will represent Alcorn State University during the 2018–19 NCAA Division I men's basketball season. The Braves, led by fourth-year head coach Montez Robinson, will play their home games at the Davey Whitney Complex in Lorman, Mississippi, as members of the Southwestern Athletic Conference.

Previous season
The Braves finished the 2017–18 season, 11–21, 7–11 in SWAC play to finish in eighth place. Due to Grambling State's ineligibility, they received the No. 7 seed in the SWAC tournament, where they lost in the quarterfinals to Prairie View A&M.

Roster

Schedule and results

|-
!colspan=12 style=| Non-Conference Regular season

|-
!colspan=12 style=| SWAC regular season

|-
!colspan=12 style=| SWAC tournament
|-

|-

Source

References

Alcorn State Braves basketball seasons
Alcorn State Braves
Alcorn State Braves basketball team
Alcorn State Braves basketball team